Alfredo Cristiano Keil (3 July 1850 – 4 October 1907) was a Portuguese romantic composer and painter.

Keil was born in Lisbon, the son of Johann Christian Keil (son of Johann Georg Keil and wife Elisabeth ...) and wife (m. Lisbon, 30 August 1848) Maria Josefina Stellflug (daughter of Matias Stellflug and wife Barbara ...). He was of German origin, and was the great Portuguese romantic composer. He was also considered the last important Portuguese painter in the Romantic style. He studied in Munich and Nuremberg with the German romantic painters Kaulbach and von Kreling. Returning to Portugal, where he continued his studies, he became a well known romantic painter, being also the contemporary of the Naturalist generation, with his melancholic intimate scenes and landscapes.

As a composer, he gained prominence with his operas Donna Bianca (1888), Irene (1893) and Serrana (1899), then considered the best Portuguese opera.

He composed the music of A Portuguesa, the Portuguese national anthem, in 1891, with lyrics by poet and playwright Henrique Lopes de Mendonça; it was officially adopted in 1911, after the proclamation of the Republic the previous year. Ironically, he died, in Hamburg, almost exactly three years before the first day of the Revolution.

Family
He married Cleyde Maria Margarida Cinatti, daughter of Italian parents Giuseppe Luigi Cinatti (son of Luigi Cinatti and wife Maria Nicolina ...) and wife Margherita Rivolto (daughter of Giacomo Rivolto and wife Margherita Sertorio), and had issue:
 Joana Maria Francisca Cinatti Keil
 Guida Maria Josefina Cinatti Keil, married firstly to Jaime Raúl de Brito Carvalho da Silva, and had issue, two children, and married secondly as his first wife to Francisco Coelho do Amaral Reis, 1st Viscount of Pedralva by Carlos I of Portugal in 1904 (Sátão, Águas Boas, 3 August 1873 – 5 April 1938), 100th Governor of Portuguese Angola from 1920 to 1921, son of José Caetano dos Reis and wife Lucrécia Coelho do Amaral, and had issue, an only son, renown Architect Francisco Keil do Amaral:
 Maria Sara Keil Carvalho da Silva
 Eduardo Alfredo Keil Carvalho da Silva, married to Dolores dos Santos Mendes, and had issue, three children: 
 Eduardo Artur Mendes Keil Carvalho da Silva
 Guida Maria Mendes Keil Carvalho da Silva, had natural children one by ... Morais Marques and two by ... Teixeira: 
 Inês Raquel Carvalho da Silva Morais Marques
 Tito Carvalho da Silva Teixeira
 Erica Carvalho da Silva Teixeira
 Carlos Eduardo Mendes Keil Carvalho da Silva
 Luís Cristiano Cinatti Keil
 Paulo Henrique Cinatti Keil

References

External links 
 Bio, Catalogue and Audio Samples
 
 Tojos e rosmaninhos, Lisbon 1907, at the National Library of Portugal

1850 births
1907 deaths
19th-century classical composers
20th-century classical composers
Romantic composers
19th-century Portuguese painters
Portuguese male painters
19th-century male artists
Portuguese classical composers
National anthem writers
Portuguese people of German descent
Portuguese expatriates in Germany
German people of Portuguese descent
People from Lisbon
Portuguese opera composers
20th-century Portuguese painters
20th-century male artists
19th-century Portuguese musicians
20th-century Portuguese musicians
20th-century Portuguese male musicians